The following is a list of the 100 largest metropolitan areas in the United States with large African American populations. As a result of slavery, more than half of African Americans live in the South. The data is sourced from the 2010 and 2020 United States Censuses.

By 2020 Census population

See also

 African American neighborhoods
 List of African American neighborhoods
 List of U.S. cities with large African-American populations
 List of U.S. states by African-American population

References 

African American
African-American demographics
African American-related lists